The Mosquito Range (elevation approximately 14,000 ft) is a high mountain range in the Rocky Mountains of central Colorado in the United States. The peaks of the range form a ridge running north–south for roughly 40 mi (64 km) from southern Summit County on the north end, then along the boundary between Lake and Park Counties. The ranges forms a high barrier separating the headwaters of the Arkansas River near Leadville from South Park and the headwaters of the South Platte River near Fairplay. The highest peak in the range is Mount Lincoln at an elevation of 14,286 ft. Other fourteeners in the range are Quandary Peak (14,272 ft), Mount Bross (14,172 ft), Mount Democrat (14,148 ft), and Mount Sherman (14,036 ft).

Geology 
The mountains are faulted anticlines formed as part of the Sawatch Uplift during the Laramide orogeny around 65 million years ago (Mya). The mountains were originally contiguous with the higher Sawatch Range to the west, but were separated during the formation of the rift valley at the headwaters of the Arkansas River about 35 Mya.  The range is primarily of granite. The eastern flank of the range along the rim of South Park is overlain by Paleozoic and Mesozoic sedimentary rocks. The northern end of the range was glaciated during Pleistocene time, forming U-shaped valleys in the canyons.

The high ridge of the range forms a relatively difficult barrier between South Park and the Arkansas headwaters. Several of the high peaks of the range are prominently visible from the southern side of Fremont Pass along State Highway 91 between Climax and Leadville. The range is not traversed by any major highway, but only in two places  by backroads over high passes: Mosquito Pass and Weston Pass. Much of the range is located within the Pike National Forest.

Highest peaks

See also

Southern Rocky Mountains
Tenmile Range

References

External links

Mosquito Range at Peakbagger.com

Mountain ranges of Colorado
Ranges of the Rocky Mountains
Landforms of Summit County, Colorado
Landforms of Lake County, Colorado
Landforms of Park County, Colorado